This is a list of official Vermont State Historic Sites in the U.S. state of Vermont.
Bennington Battle Monument State Historic Site –  Obelisk commemorating the Battle of Bennington
Chester A. Arthur State Historic Site – President Chester A. Arthur birthplace
Chimney Point State Historic Site – Exhibits interpreting over 7,500 years of human habitation by three cultures; Native American,  French colonial, and Early American 
President Calvin Coolidge State Historic Site – President Calvin Coolidge birthplace and homestead
Eureka Schoolhouse State Historic Site – c. 1790 early Vermont one room school house
Hubbardton Battlefield – site of the Revolutionary War Battle of Hubbardton
Senator Justin Morrill State Historic Site – Justin Smith Morrill homestead 
Mount Independence – site of Revolutionary War fortifications
Old Constitution House State Historic Site – Site of Vermont Constitution's convention
Seven shipwrecks in the waters of Lake Champlain:
Burlington Bay Horse Ferry
General Butler
O.J. Walker
Phoenix
Champlain II
Coal Barge
Diamond Island Stone Boat

External links
Official website
Protected shipwreck list

 
Vermont State Historic Sites